The first constituency for French residents overseas (French: Première circonscription des Français établis hors de France) is one of eleven constituencies representing French citizens living abroad. It was created by the 2010 redistricting of French legislative constituencies and elects, since 2012, one representative to the National Assembly.

It represents all French citizens living in Canada and the United States. It is the most populous constituency of its kind, containing 231,328 registered French voters as of 2022.

Area represented

The First constituency for French residents overseas encompasses the following countries and French consular constituencies:

  (79,328 French registered)
 1st voting constituency: consular constituencies of Ottawa, Toronto, and Vancouver.
 2nd voting constituency: consular constituencies of Moncton, Halifax, Montréal, and Québec.
  (122,686 French registered)
 1st voting constituency: consular constituencies of Atlanta, Boston, Miami, New York City, and Washington, D.C.
 2nd voting constituency: consular constituencies of Chicago.
 3rd voting constituency: consular constituencies of Houston and New Orleans.
 4th voting constituency: consular constituencies of Los Angeles and San Francisco.

Deputy

National Assembly elections

2022

 
 
 
 
|-
| colspan="8" bgcolor="#E9E9E9"|
|-

2017

2013 by-election
Following the invalidation of the 2012 election, a by-election was held on May 25 and June 8, 2013.

Candidates
The list of candidates was officially released on May 6, 2013, with twelve candidates:

The Socialist Party was represented by Franck Scemama who lived in France. His deputy was Annie Michel.

The Union for a Popular Movement was represented once again by Frédéric Lefebvre. His deputy was Olivier Piton.

Europe Ecology – The Greens was represented by Cyrille Giraud who had been deputy to Narassiguin in the previous election. His deputy was Emmanuelle Garcia-Guillen.

The Left Front was represented once again by Céline Clément. Her deputy was Jean-Baptiste Plouhinec.

The Democratic Movement was represented by Nicolas Druet who lived in Montreal. His deputy was Martine Volard.

The Union of Democrats and Independents was represented by Louis Giscard d'Estaing who lived in Chamalières, France. His deputy was Séverine Boitier.

The Rally of French Citizens Abroad (Rassemblement des Français de l’étranger) was represented by Damien Regnard who lived in New Orleans. His deputy was Virginie Beaudet.

The National Front was represented by Thierry Franck Fautre who lived in Florida. His deputy was Sylvie Verez.

The Pirate Party was represented by Véronique Vermorel who lived in Boston. Her deputy was Mathieu Chambefort.

Solidarity and Progress was represented once again by Karel Vereycken.

Nicolas Rousseaux was an independent candidate who lived in France. His deputy was Raphaël Rousseaux.

Pauline Czartoryska was an independent candidate who lived in France and previously worked in Maryland. Her deputy was Emmanuèle Pillard.

Results

2012

Candidates
The list of candidates was officially finalised on 14 May. There were eighteen candidates:

The Union for a Popular Movement chose Finance Minister Christine Lagarde (who had never been a member of Parliament) as its candidate in April 2011. Lagarde, however, subsequently became Managing Director of the International Monetary Fund, and in November the party chose Frédéric Lefebvre, Secretary of State for Commerce, to replace her as candidate.

The Socialist Party chose Corinne Narassiguin, a resident of New York City. Her deputy (suppléant) was originally Yves Alavo, a resident of Montreal. Europe Écologie–The Greens had chosen Rémi Piet, with Sabrina Feddal as his deputy (suppléante). Piet, a resident of Miami, teaches international relations at the University of Miami. In January 2012, Europe Écologie–The Greens and the Socialist Party merged their efforts to create a new ticket featuring Corinne Narassiguin (Socialist) and Cyrille Giraud (EELV), a resident of Montreal.

The Democratic Movement chose Carole Granade. A resident of San Francisco, she was a former director of the city's French American Chamber of Commerce.

The Left Front, which includes the French Communist Party, chose Céline Clément, a senior lecturer in Psychology at the University of Strasbourg. She had several years' experience working in Quebec, and a Canadian partner. Her deputy (suppléant) was Thomas Collombat, a professor of Quebec Studies at Western Washington University.

The National Front chose Claire Savreux.

The centre-right Radical Party and the centrist Republican, Ecologist and Social Alliance jointly chose Philippe Manteau as their candidate. He was also endorsed by the Liberal Democratic Party. Aurélia Palvel-Marmont was his deputy (suppléante).

The centre-left Radical Party of the Left chose Stéphanie Bowring, a long-term resident of Saint-Pierre-et-Miquelon, and a dual citizen of France and Canada. Jean Lachaud was her deputy (suppléant).

The Pirate Party chose Raphaël Clayette, with Olivier Henebelle as his deputy (suppléant).

Solidarity and Progress, the French branch of the LaRouche movement, was represented by Karel Vereycken, with Dominique Revault-D'Allonnes as his deputy. Vereycken described himself as a friend of Jacques Cheminade and Lyndon LaRouche.

Julien Balkany, a resident of New York City and a member of the Union for a Popular Movement, stood as a dissident candidate, having failed to obtain the party's endorsement. François Lubrina was his deputy (suppléant).

Gérard Michon, a resident of the United States for 31 years who was serving his fourth mandate at the Assembly of French Citizens Abroad, for the constituency including San Francisco, stood as an independent candidate. Despite being a member of the Union for a Popular Movement, he too stood against the party's endorsed candidate. Marc Cormier was his deputy (suppléant).

Antoine Treuille, a businessman, president of the French-American Foundation, and long-term resident of the United States, stood as an independent right-wing candidate. If elected, he said he would sit with the Union for a Popular Movement.

Christophe Navel was an independent candidate, presenting himself as neither left nor right. Matthieu Deborde was his deputy (suppléant).

Mike Remondeau was an independent candidate. A 31-year-old resident of Tampa, Florida, he was studying for a master's degree in political sciences. He called his political movement the "Circle of North Americans" (Cercle des Nord-Américains), and stood on a platform of "ideological laïcité", and a common cultural identity for French residents in North America. Christian Routier was his deputy.

Emile Servan-Schreiber, with Christian Déséglise as his deputy, was an "independent centre-right" candidate.

The other independent candidates were: Louis Le Guyader (with Claire Le Guyader as his deputy); Jean-Michel Vernochet (with Lieu Nguyen as his deputy); and Rob Temene (with Betty Millet as his deputy).

Campaign
Due in part to the sheer size of the constituency, certain candidates barely campaigned at all, while others "made every effort to travel around" the United States and Canada and "mobilise their scattered voters". Los Angeles, with a sizable French expatriate population, was a focal point for some. Among issues of concern to voters were education (access to French schools for their children) and retirement pensions.

On 23 May, France 24 organised a televised debate in New York City for the eight candidates it deemed "active" in terms of their campaign :  Corinne Narassiguin (Socialist), Frédéric Lefebvre (UMP) Carole Granade (MoDem), Philippe Manteau (ARES), Julien Balkany (dissident UMP), Gérard Michon (dissident UMP), Antoine Treuille (misc. right), and Emile Servan-Schreiber (misc. right). Seven of the invited candidates took part; Lefebvre indicated he did not wish to.

Results
Turnout in the first round was low: 22.5% in Canada and 18.9% in the United States. With the mainstream right strongly divided (four dissident candidates standing against the UMP-endorsed candidate), Socialist Corinne Narassiguin obtained a comfortable lead in the first round, in both countries of the constituency.

In the second round, Narassiguin won by a comfortable margin, in what was described as an "incredible" win for the left. The constituency had been deemed a safe seat for the right. Commentators in Libération pointed to Narassiguin's strong and active campaign, and suggested that rightwing voters had rejected UMP candidate Frédéric Lefebvre, who spoke little English and was perceived as knowing little about North America.

Subsequent invalidation
In February 2013, the election of Corinne Narassiguin was annulled by the Constitutional Council, due to irregularities in the funding of her electoral campaigns. She was barred from standing for public office for a period of one year. Defeated candidates Antoine Treuille and Emile Servan-Schreiber were also barred from standing for public office for a year, for the same reason.

Presidential elections

2017

|- style="background:#e9e9e9; text-align:center;"
! colspan="2" rowspan="2" style="text-align:left;" | Candidate
! rowspan="2" colspan="2" style="text-align:left;" | Party
! colspan="2" | 1st round
! colspan="2" | 2nd round
|- style="background:#e9e9e9; text-align:center;"
! style="width:75px;"| Votes
! style="width:30px;"| %
! style="width:75px;"| Votes
! style="width:30px;"| %
|-
| style="background-color:" |
| style="text-align:left;" | Emmanuel Macron
| style="text-align:left;" | En Marche!
| EM
| 
| 45.17%
| 
| 91.08%
|-
| style="background-color:" |
| style="text-align:left;" | François Fillon
| style="text-align:left;" | The Republicans
| LR
| 
| 21.25%
| colspan="2" rowspan="3" style="background:#e9e9e9;"|
|-
| style="background-color:" |
| style="text-align:left;" | Jean-Luc Mélenchon
| style="text-align:left;" | La France insoumise
| FI
| 
| 17.08%
|-
| style="background-color:" |
| style="text-align:left;" | Benoît Hamon
| style="text-align:left;" | Socialist Party
| PS
| 
| 7.08%
|-
| style="background-color:" |
| style="text-align:left;" | Marine Le Pen
| style="text-align:left;" | National Front
| FN
| 
| 5.99%
| 
| 8.92%
|-
| style="background-color:" |
| style="text-align:left;" | Nicolas Dupont-Aignan
| style="text-align:left;" | Debout la France
| DLF
| 
| 1.41%
| colspan="2" rowspan="6" style="background:#e9e9e9;"|
|-
| style="background:#0b7d86;"|
| style="text-align:left;"| François Asselineau
| style="text-align:left;"| Popular Republican Union
| UPR
| 
| 0.86%
|-
| style="background-color:" |
| style="text-align:left;" | Philippe Poutou
| style="text-align:left;" | New Anticapitalist Party
| NPA
| 
| 0.46%
|-
| style="background:#ffa54c;"|
| style="text-align:left;"| Jean Lassalle
| colspan="2" style="text-align:left;"| Résistons!
| 
| 0.35%
|-
| style="background-color:" |
| style="text-align:left;" | Nathalie Arthaud
| style="text-align:left;" | Lutte Ouvrière
| LO
| 
| 0.18%
|-
| style="background-color:" |
| style="text-align:left;"| Jacques Cheminade
| style="text-align:left;"| Solidarity and Progress
| S&P
| 
| 0.15%
|-
| colspan="8" style="background:#e9e9e9;"|
|- style="font-weight:bold"
| colspan="4" style="text-align:left;" | Total
| 
| 100%
| 
| 100%
|}

2012

2007

Assembly of French citizens abroad

The first constituency for French residents overseas encompasses six voting constituency for the assembly of French citizens abroad.

 Canada
 1st voting constituency: consular constituencies of Ottawa, Toronto and Vancouver.
 2nd voting constituency: consular constituencies of Moncton, Halifax, Montréal and Québec.
 
 1st voting constituency: consular constituencies of Atlanta, Boston, Miami, New York City and Washington.
 2nd voting constituency: consular constituencies of Chicago.
 3rd voting constituency: consular constituencies of Houston and La Nouvelle-Orléans.
 4th voting constituency: consular constituencies of Los Angeles and San Francisco.

2009 election

Canadian protest
In September 2011, the Canadian Foreign Affairs Ministry stated that it would not accept the inclusion of Canada into an electoral constituency of any foreign state. It explained that it was concerned an elected representative of French residents to the French National Assembly might be perceived as a representative of Canada, thus undermining the perception of Canadian sovereignty. In practice, however, officials admitted they could not prevent French residents from voting. (Canada also stated it could not accept its inclusion in similar overseas constituencies established by Tunisia and Italy, stating that Tunisians in Canada would be forbidden from electing a representative, and demanding that Italy abolish its overseas constituency which includes Canada.)

The French Foreign Affairs Ministry stated in January 2012 that French residents in Canada would indeed be able to elect a representative for the French communities of North America, even as the Canadian Foreign Affairs Ministry reiterated that this was not acceptable. Le Monde wrote that there would probably be a "de facto compromise", whereby Canada would tacitly recognise the diplomatic inviolability of French consulates where the voting would take place. This was what had happened for the election of a Tunisian constituent assembly in October 2011, where Canada had objected to the existence of "international districts" for the Tunisian legislature, but had done nothing in practice to prevent Tunisians residents in Canada from electing a representative.

References

1